Logic forms are simple, first-order logic knowledge representations of natural language sentences formed by the conjunction of concept predicates related through shared arguments. Each noun, verb, adjective, adverb, pronoun, preposition and conjunction generates a predicate. Logic forms can be decorated with word senses to disambiguate the semantics of the word. There are two types of predicates: events are marked with e, and entities are marked with x. The shared arguments connect the subjects and objects of verbs and prepositions together. Example input/output might look like this:
 Input:  The Earth provides the food we eat every day.
 Output: Earth:n_#1(x1) provide:v_#2(e1, x1, x2) food:n_#1(x2) we(x3) eat:v_#1(e2, x3, x2; x4) day:n_#1(x4)

Logic forms are used in some natural language processing techniques, such as question answering, as well as in inference both for database systems and QA systems.

References
 

Natural language processing
Computational linguistics
Knowledge representation